Oleksiy Serhiyovych Palamarchuk (born 22 July 1991) is a Ukrainian professional footballer who plays as a goalkeeper for Inhulets Petrove.

Club career
Palamarchuk is a product of the Odesa Youth Football School System. 2009 he made his professional debut for the senior squad of "Dniester" from Ovidiopol. In the beginning of 2020 Palamarchuk became a player of "Chornomorets" Odesa. On June 25, 2020 he made his debut for the senior squad of "Chornomorets" in the Ukrainian First League match against "Volyn" Lutsk.

References

External links
 
 
Player profile at the Ukrainian Premier League official website 
Player profile at the Ukrainian First League official website 

1991 births
Living people
People from Bender, Moldova
Ukrainian footballers
FC Dnister Ovidiopol players
FC Balkany Zorya players
FC Chornomorets Odesa players
FC Hirnyk-Sport Horishni Plavni players
FC Inhulets Petrove players
Association football goalkeepers
Ukrainian Premier League players
Ukrainian First League players
Ukrainian Second League players
Ukrainian Amateur Football Championship players